Lessingia is a genus of plants in the family Asteraceae which are native to western North America. Several species are endemic to California.

Lessingias are generally daisy-like in appearance with white, yellow, or purple flowers, but they vary in appearance. Some lessingias are sometimes treated as members of different genera, such as Benitoa. The San Francisco lessingia, Lessingia germanorum, is an endangered species.

 Species
 Lessingia arachnoidea - Crystal Springs lessingia - California (Sonoma, San Mateo, Santa Cruz Cos)
 Lessingia germanorum - San Francisco lessingia - California (San Mateo Co)
 Lessingia glandulifera - valley lessingia - California, Arizona, Nevada
 Lessingia hololeuca - woollyhead lessingia - California (from Yolo + Sonoma Cos to Monterey Co)
 Lessingia lemmonii - Lemmon's lessingia - Arizona, California
 Lessingia leptoclada - Sierra lessingia - California (from Plumas Co to Los Angeles Co)
 Lessingia micradenia - Mt. Tamalpais lessingia - California (Marin + Santa Clara Cos)
 Lessingia nana - dwarf lessingia - California (From Tehama Co to Kern Co)
 Lessingia nemaclada - slenderstem lessingia - California (From Siskiyou Co to Kern Co)
 Lessingia pectinata - Sonoma lessingia - California (From San Bernardino Co to Contra Coasta + El Dorado Cos)
 Lessingia ramulosa - California (From Tehama Co to Marin Co)
 Lessingia tenuis - spring lessingia - California (From Ventura Co to Alameda Co)
 Lessingia virgata - wand lessingia - California (From Fresno Co to Shasta Co)

 formerly included
Species once regarded as part of Lessingia, now considered more suited to other genera: Artemisia Benitoa Cacalia Chrysolaena Corethrogyne Lessingianthus Vernonia

References

External links
 USDA Plants Profile
 Jepson Manual Treatment

 
Asteraceae genera
Flora of the Western United States
Taxa named by Adelbert von Chamisso